Fanuj (also Romanized as Fanūj, Fannūj, Pannūj and Fānūch) is a city in and the capital of Fanuj District, in Fanuj County, Sistan and Baluchestan Province, Iran. At the 2006 census, its population was 9,706, in 2,124 families.

Fanuj is estimated to sit on 3.6 billion tonnes of titanium reserves. The Fanuj prospect includes a cluster of 30 deposits, each able to yield 1 million tonnes of titanium ore per year.

References

Populated places in Fanuj County

Cities in Sistan and Baluchestan Province